Saimir Kastrati (born 7 March 1987 in Laç) is an Albanian football player who most recently plays for Besëlidhja Lezhë in the Albanian First Division.

References

External links
 Profile at Football Database
 Profile at FSHF

1987 births
Living people
People from Laç
Association football defenders
Albanian footballers
KF Laçi players
KF Adriatiku Mamurrasi players
Besëlidhja Lezhë players
Kategoria Superiore players
Kategoria e Parë players